Northleach with Eastington is a civil parish in the English county of Gloucestershire that includes the town of Northleach and the hamlet of Eastington, about 1 miles SE of the town.

It forms part of the Cotswold district.

History 
The parish was formed on 1 April 1935 from the parishes of "Northleach" and "Eastington" and part of Hampnett.

Freedom of the Town
The following people and military units have received the Freedom of the Town of Northleach with Eastington.

Individuals
 Christopher Hancock: 24 April 2019.

References

 David Verey, Gloucestershire: the Cotswolds, The Buildings of England edited by Nikolaus Pevsner, 2nd ed. (1979) , p. 343

Civil parishes in Gloucestershire
Cotswold District